Rafael Spregelburd (born 1970 in Buenos Aires) is an Argentine playwright, director and actor. He studied acting and drama at the University of Buenos Aires.
From 1995 he started directing, mainly in theatre performances of his own works.
He won a number of awards including the Tirso de Molina.
His plays are critically acclaimed in Argentina and in some European countries.

Selected works 
Spam (2014)
Todo. Apátrida. Envidia. (2011)
La paranoia (2008)
Bizarra (2008)
Lúcido (2006)

Selected filmography

References

External links
 Official website
 

1970 births
Living people
People from Buenos Aires
Argentine male film actors
Argentine dramatists and playwrights